Mehrdad Pahlbod (16 March 1917 – 9 August 2018), born as Ezatollah Minbashian, was an Iranian politician who served as the first culture minister of Iran from 1964 until 1978.

Biography
Pahlbod was born in Tehran into the musical family of Minbashian. His father was Colonel Nasru'llah Minbashian, Imperial Iranian Army Band Corps. His relative Gholam-Hossein Minbashian, a professional violinist, was the conductor of Tehran City Hall Symphony Orchestra (later Tehran Symphony Orchestra) and the director of Tehran Conservatory of Music for years. Pahlbod studied architecture in Switzerland and in 1956 became the vice president of the Persian Fine Arts Administration in Tehran; an organisation which later became the Iranian Ministry of Culture.

He was a violinist and music teacher. He served as a deputy at the Ministry of Education until 1961. Between March 1964 and January 1965 he was the deputy prime minister in the cabinet led by Hassan Ali Mansur. He was also the minister for culture and the arts between 1965 and 1978.

Mehrdad Pahlbod was the second husband of Princess Shams Pahlavi. The couple secretly converted to Catholic Christianity from Shia Islam in the 1950s in Egypt.

In the years after the 1979 Islamic Revolution, Pahlbod lived in exile in Los Angeles where he died on 9 August 2018 at the age of 101.

He received the Order of Homayoun 1st Class, the Order of the Crown 4th Class, the Coron Medal in Gold in 1967 and the 2,500-year celebration of the Persian Empire Medal in Gold on 15 October 1971, was Knight of Grand-Cross of the Order of Merit of the Italian Republic of Italy on 15 December 1974, etc.

References

External links

 Mehrdad Pahlbod: Eminent Persians by Abbas Milani

1917 births
2018 deaths
Culture ministers
Politicians from Tehran
Iranian emigrants to the United States
Exiles of the Iranian Revolution in the United States
Converts to Roman Catholicism from Shia Islam
Iranian Roman Catholics
Iranian centenarians
Men centenarians
20th-century Iranian politicians
People of Pahlavi Iran